Çanakpınar can refer to:

 Çanakpınar, Akseki
 Çanakpınar, Oltu